Nikolaj Hübbe (born 30 October 1967) is artistic director of the Royal Danish Ballet.

Career
Since becoming artistic director of the Royal Danish Ballet, Hübbe has successfully staged new productions of Bournonville's Napoli (2009) and A Folk Tale (2011) as well as Marius Petipa's La Bayadère (2012).

Farewell performance 

Hübbe's farewell at City Ballet was held at the New York State Theater, Lincoln Center, on 10 February 2008.

Footnotes

Reviews 

NY Times by Alastair Macaulay, 12 February 2008
NY Sun by Joel Lobenthal, 12 February 2008

Interview 
Reuters, 5 October 2007, New Danish ballet chief at home with heritage

External links 
Archival footage of Nikolaj Hubbe and Darci Kistler performing Apollo in 2002 at Jacob's Pillow
Ballet Alert, 15 May 1999

Ballet masters
Danish male ballet dancers
New York City Ballet principal dancers
Royal Danish Ballet dancers
Mae L. Wien Faculty Award recipients
1967 births
Living people
School of American Ballet faculty